Ashlee Ross-Naess( Simpson) (born October 3, 1984) known professionally as Ashlee Simpson, is an American singer and actress. The younger sister of singer and actress Jessica Simpson, she began her career as a back-up dancer for her sister and appeared in television commercials at the age of 15. She later pursued a career as an actress and had a main role on the family drama 7th Heaven. She appeared on the reality show Newlyweds: Nick and Jessica, broadcast on MTV between 2003 and 2005, which focused on Ashlee's older sister Jessica and Jessica's then-husband Nick Lachey. While working on her debut studio album, Simpson became the star of a spin-off reality series, The Ashlee Simpson Show, which was broadcast on MTV between 2004 and 2005. Like her sister before her, Simpson became the center of considerable media attention.

Her breakout came with her debut single, "Pieces of Me", which was released in 2004, became a top-five hit in the United States and topped the Billboard Mainstream Top 40 chart based on radio airplay. The success of the single and her reality show helped propel her debut album, Autobiography, also released in 2004, to the top of the Billboard 200 albums chart. The project sold over five million copies worldwide, making it her most successful album to date. Simpson had a leading role in the film Undiscovered (2005), which became a critical and commercial flop. The failure of the film, along with multiple critically panned performances, led to media scrutiny. Despite that, Simpson's second studio album, I Am Me (2005), debuted atop the Billboard 200, becoming her second album to do so. The album went on to receive a platinum certification from the Recording Industry Association of America (RIAA).

Following her appearance as Roxie Hart in the West End production of Chicago, Simpson announced that she had begun working on her third studio album. The album differed from the pop-rock sound of her previous efforts, featuring a dance-pop and 1980s-themed sound. Bittersweet World was released in 2008 to positive critical reception, but it saw a decline in sales. The effort reached number 4 on the Billboard 200. The following year, Simpson joined the main cast of the Melrose Place revamp, which was met with harsh critical reception. Later that year, she made her Broadway debut reprising her role as Roxie Hart in Chicago on Broadway.

Simpson announced a fourth studio album that same year. She independently released the single "Bat for a Heart" (2012), though it failed to have success. Simpson eventually scrapped the album and focused on her child. Simpson reprised her role as Roxie Hart for the third time in a 2-dates special production in Hollywood Bowl in July 2013 directed by Brooke Shields. In October, Simpson and her husband Evan Ross released their debut extended play (EP) by Ashlee + Evan through Access Records, which was supported by a tour in select cities across North America, and their TV-reality show.

Life and career

1984–2002: Early life and career beginnings
Simpson's parents are Tina and Joe Simpson. She has one older sister, Jessica Simpson. Both Ashlee and Jessica attended Prairie Creek Elementary and North Junior High, located in Richardson, Texas, where the girls were raised. When Ashlee was three years old, she began studying classical ballet. She enrolled at the School of American Ballet in New York City when she was eleven, becoming the youngest person ever to be admitted into the school. Though the age requirement for the school was twelve, Simpson's father admitted to lying about her age. During this time, Simpson suffered from an unnamed eating disorder for about six months, eventually receiving treatment from her parents. The Simpson family relocated to Los Angeles, California, in 1999, as Jessica pursued a singing career. While Jessica launched her career, Ashlee began appearing in television commercials. Her father, Joe, served as her agent.

Following the commercial success of Jessica's debut album Sweet Kisses (1999), Ashlee became one of her back-up dancers on tour. Hoping to pursue a career in acting, Simpson had a minor guest appearance on an episode of Malcolm in the Middle. The following year, Simpson had a small role as Monique in the Rob Schneider comedy film The Hot Chick (2002). She joined the seventh season of the family drama 7th Heaven as Cecilia Smith, a role which she continued to portray in the eighth season. Simpson appeared in a total of forty episodes as Cecilia. That same year, Ashlee recorded a song titled "Christmas Past, Present, and Future" for the holiday album School's Out! Christmas; the song was later re-released on Radio Disney Jingle Jams following Simpson's musical breakthrough. She later recorded the song "Just Let Me Cry" for the soundtrack to the film Freaky Friday (2003). Simpson later began writing and recording demos, in hopes of finding a record label. It was confirmed a month after the release of the Freaky Friday soundtrack that Simpson had signed with Geffen Records to release her debut studio album.

2003–2004: Breakthrough, Autobiography and Saturday Night Live incident
It was announced that Jessica Simpson and then-husband Nick Lachey would star in their own MTV reality series, Newlyweds: Nick and Jessica. The series, which chronicled Jessica and Nick's life as a married couple, became a pop culture phenomenon and helped draw attention to the Simpson sisters. Ashlee was a VJ on TRL on MTV in the United States during the summer of 2003. Following the success of the series, it was confirmed that Ashlee would receive her own series, The Ashlee Simpson Show. Hoping to end comparisons between her and her sister, Ashlee wanted the series to focus on the recording of her debut album. During this time, Simpson also dyed her naturally blonde hair brown, a decision that received media attention. While filming the show, Simpson appeared in the music video for musician Ryan Cabrera's debut single "On the Way Down" (2004), portraying herself as Cabrera's love interest. The couple later began a romantic relationship, with Cabrera inspiring multiple songs for Simpson's album.

Simpson wanted her debut album to consist of pop-rock music, as she did not listen to pop music. The project was produced by John Shanks, while Simpson co-wrote all of the songs on the album. She also worked with songwriter Kara DioGuardi on the album, with DioGuardi receiving credits on seven of the album's tracks. The album's lead single, "Pieces of Me", became an instant hit in the United States. The song became a top-five hit on the Billboard Hot 100 chart and topped the Mainstream Top 40 chart based on pop radio airplay. "Pieces of Me" earned a gold certification from the Recording Industry Association of America (RIAA), denoting 500,000 copies of the single being sold. Her debut album, Autobiography, was released on July 20, 2004, to a generally mixed critical reception. The album debuted at the top of the Billboard 200 albums chart in the United States, selling an estimated 398,000 copies in its first week of release. It was the highest-selling debut album by a female artist that year, going on to sell over 2.5 million copies in the United States by January 2005. The success of the album and its lead single was attributed to the exposure from her reality television series. The album sold over five million copies worldwide.

On October 23, 2004, Simpson infamously appeared as a musical guest on an episode of Saturday Night Live to promote the album. She first performed the single "Pieces of Me", and was set to perform the song "Autobiography" as the second song. As the second performance was set to begin, the vocals for "Pieces of Me" were heard again, revealing that Simpson had lip-synced her previous performance. Simpson began to do an impromptu jig as her band transitioned into playing "Pieces of Me" again. She then walked off the stage as her band continued to play without her for several seconds, before the show cut to commercial. During the closing of the show, Simpson appeared with the guest host, Jude Law, and said, "I feel so bad! My band started playing the wrong song, and I didn't know what to do, so I thought I'd do a hoedown." The performance received significant media attention and was met with backlash. Days later, Simpson called music video series Total Request Live and explained that she was advised not to sing live due to acid reflux disease, which was later confirmed by 60 Minutes in a piece they had filmed about SNL. Simpson said of the incident, "I made a complete fool of myself."

Despite the negative media attention surrounding the incident, Simpson released "Shadow" as the second single from Autobiography in the United States. The song did not receive a release in European territories. It failed to have the success of its predecessor, though it did reach the top twenty of the Mainstream Top 40 chart, becoming her second hit on the chart. The song lyrically spoke of her views towards her older sister's success. The song received a positive critical reception, with some praising it as a highlight for the album. "La La" was released as the album's third and final single in January 2005, and again failed to match the success of "Pieces of Me". Despite a low peak on the Hot 100 chart, the song received a gold certification from the RIAA. The song served as only the second single in European territories. Simpson and Cabrera ended their relationship, though the two remained friends. At the Teen Choice Awards on August 8, 2004, Simpson received the "Song of the Summer" Teen Choice Award for "Pieces of Me", as well as the "Fresh Face" Award. She also won the Billboard Award for New Female Artist of the Year in December, and in the same month, Entertainment Weekly named her one of its Breakout Stars of 2004.

2005–2007: I Am Me, media scrutiny, and Broadway
In January 2005, gossip news outlets began speculating that Simpson and actor Wilmer Valderrama were romantically involved, leading to rumors of a "love triangle" between the pair and Valderrama's ex-girlfriend Lindsay Lohan. Despite this, representatives for Simpson claimed that the two had been friends for years, and there was no romantic interest. Simpson appeared as a musical guest during halftime at the 2005 Orange Bowl in Miami, Florida. Her performance of "La La" garnered a negative reception from the crowd, leading to boos. In February 2005, Simpson embarked on her Autobiography Tour throughout North America. Featuring a total of thirty-seven shows, the tour saw Simpson performing songs from her debut album, as well as covers and a previously unreleased song. While on tour, Simpson wrote material for her second studio album. Simpson had a supporting role in the film Undiscovered, portraying an aspiring actress named Clea. But the film was a critical and commercial failure, and it earned Simpson a nomination for Worst Supporting Actress at the 2005 Golden Raspberry Awards.

Simpson released her second studio album, I Am Me, in October 2005. The album featured similar pop-rock themes as found on her debut effort, though Simpson hoped to incorporate the feel of music from the 1980s into her sound. Much like her previous release, Simpson co-wrote all of the songs on the album. It became her second album to debut at the top of the Billboard 200 chart, with first-week sales of 220,000 copies in the United States. The album failed to match the success of Autobiography, though it went on to sell over three million copies worldwide. The album's lead single, "Boyfriend", was written and composed about the rumors between Simpson and Valderama, and it became her second top-twenty hit in the United States. For the release of the album, Simpson went back to her blonde hair. The album's second and final single, "L.O.V.E.", entered the top forty in the United States. Simpson appeared for a second time as a musical performer on Saturday Night Live, performing the song "Catch Me When I Fall", which was inspired by her previous appearance on the series, as well as "Boyfriend". This time, both songs were performed without any adverse incident. In mid-December, Simpson collapsed after performing in Japan and was briefly hospitalized, consequently canceling an appearance at the Radio Music Awards. The collapse and her subsequent hospitalization were attributed to exhaustion as a result of her busy work schedule.

Simpson embarked on her I Am Me Tour in the final months of 2005 and began dating her drummer Braxton Olita. In March 2006, Simpson won an MTV celebrity surfing invitational competition, which also featured celebrities such as Meagan Good, Jack Osbourne, Ashley Parker Angel, and Tony Hawk. On April 12, 2006, she hosted and performed at the MTV Australia Video Music Awards, where she won "Best Female Artist" and "Best Pop Video" for the single "Boyfriend". Simpson had a nose job in April 2006. In the May 2007 issue of Harper's Bazaar, she said that she was neither insecure about her appearance nor had been so beforehand. She said that plastic surgery was a "personal choice" that one should only decide to do for oneself and not for others. In a September 2007 interview, her father, Joe Simpson, explained of the surgery Ashlee had undergone: "There was a real problem with her breathing and that was cured." In the middle of 2006, Simpson gave an interview to Marie Claire magazine, in which she was said to have "had it with Hollywood's twisted view of feminine beauty" and was photographed painting a pro-female mural with a group of underprivileged girls from Los Angeles' Green Dot Public School. By the time the magazine hit newsstands, Simpson had already had her nose job, and some Marie Claire readers complained that this was hypocritical. The magazine received over 1,000 letters of complaint and the magazine's new editor expanded the letters section of the September issue of the magazine to give readers a chance to vent their frustrations.

Simpson embarked on her third North American tour, the L.O.V.E. Tour, to further promote her sophomore album. It was announced that I Am Me would be re-released in the following months featuring a new single "Invisible", a cover of a Jaded Era song. The single was released in June 2006 and went on to peak at number 21 on the Hot 100. It became her second single to enter the top ten of the Mainstream Top 40 chart based on pop radio airplay. Eventually, it was confirmed that a re-release of I Am Me had been scrapped. In 2006, Simpson was cast as Roxie Hart in the West End musical production of Chicago from September 25 to October 28, 2006. She received mostly positive reviews. Her performance in the show was described as "dazzling and near flawless". Following her split with Olita, it was confirmed that Simpson was in a relationship with Fall Out Boy band member Pete Wentz.

2007–2011: Bittersweet World, motherhood, marriage and return to Broadway

Following her appearance as Roxie Hart, Simpson confirmed that she had begun working on her third studio album, initially slated for release in late 2007. Geffen Records chairman Ron Fair said in December 2006 that working on Simpson's next album would be "very tricky" because of press scrutiny and "prejudices", but that Geffen would work with her to overcome that, "because she deserves to be heard and she deserves a shot." Hoping to transition to a new sound, Simpson enlisted producers Timbaland and The Neptunes to provide "beat-oriented" songs for the project. Simpson released the album's lead single, "Outta My Head (Ay Ya Ya)", in December 2007. The song featured elements of synthpop and was heavily influenced by the pop-music scene of the 1980s. The single failed to chart on the Hot 100 chart in the United States, though it had moderate success in international territories. Bittersweet World, Simpson's third studio album, was released on April 19, 2008. The album saw a decline for Simpson, debuting at number 4 on the Billboard 200 with first-week sales of 47,000 copies. Simpson launched a collection of tops in partnership with the clothing retailer Wet Seal on April 22, 2008, the same day Bittersweet World was released in the United States. The album went on to sell 126,000 copies within the first year of its release, making it her lowest-selling album to date. The release served as Simpson's final album through Geffen Records.

In February 2008, Simpson began wearing a diamond ring. She later explained that it was a promise ring from Wentz. In April 2008, Simpson and Wentz confirmed their engagement, and they wed on May 17, 2008, at Simpson's parents' residence in Encino, California, with her father officiating the ceremony. She changed her surname from Simpson to Wentz, and during the marriage was known professionally as Ashlee Simpson-Wentz. It was during this time that Simpson released the song "Little Miss Obsessive" as the second single from Bittersweet World. The song did not receive a European release and hit a peak of 96 on the Hot 100 chart in the United States. She also began appearing in commercials for Canadian retailer Zellers to promote their independent clothing line, Request, in mid-2008. Two weeks after her wedding, Simpson announced her pregnancy, thus ending promotion of "Little Miss Obsessive" and the parent album. Simpson gave birth to a son named Bronx born November 20, 2008.

In 2009, Simpson returned full-time to television episodes by playing the role of Violet Foster in Melrose Place, The CW's revamp of the 1990s series of the same name. She was originally signed to the show as a regular, but producers and CW executives decided to write out her character. Simpson left the show after twelve episodes and stated that she had known all along that her character would leave the show once the murder mystery storyline had concluded. Despite this, Ashlee's sister has spoken out against the series, claiming that Simpson brought the show free press. After her departure from Melrose Place, Simpson reprised her role in the Broadway musical production of Chicago. She began her Broadway run on November 30, 2009, and performed in New York for eight shows a week until February 7, 2010. On February 9, 2011, Simpson filed for divorce from Wentz, citing irreconcilable differences, and asked that her maiden name be restored. The divorce was finalized on November 22, 2011. The former couple released a joint statement following the announcement, stating "We remain friends and deeply committed and loving parents to our son Bronx, whose happiness and well-being remains our number one priority." Simpson appeared on the second episode of The CW's America's Next Top Model, Cycle 17 as a guest judge. She created a fashion line aimed at girls aged seven to sixteen in collaboration with her sister's successful brand. Simpson is the co-creative director of the line, which was released in the winter of 2011.

2012–present: Second marriage and television projects
Shortly after her separation from Wentz, it was confirmed that Simpson was in a relationship with actor Vincent Piazza, though the two ended their relationship nearly a year and a half after they started dating. Simpson confirmed during an interview in 2011 that she had begun working on her fourth studio album, which she described as having a "folk feel". In 2012, Simpson independently released the single "Bat for a Heart". Though the single featured explicit lyrics and a racy music video, it failed to have any success. The track was written and composed by renowned songwriter Linda Perry. The song received a mixed reception upon its release. Simpson later claimed that the album was developing more of an electronic sound. However, "Bat for a Heart" served as Simpson's final musical release for several years afterward, with no future musical plans announced and her music website being shut down. In June 2012, it was announced that Simpson was filming Pawn Shop Chronicles in Baton Rouge, Louisiana, a comedy movie released in 2013.

Simpson portrayed the character of Roxie Hart for a third time in the musical Chicago, this time in the Hollywood Bowl production of the show. Simpson's performance received mixed reviews, though she was described as an "audience favorite". In July 2013, it was reported that Simpson had begun dating actor Evan Ross, son of singer Diana Ross. Simpson and Ross became engaged in January 2014, and married on August 30, 2014, at Diana Ross's estate in Connecticut. The couple welcomed a daughter named Jagger Snow on July 30, 2015. The same month, Simpson and her husband filed requests to change their surname to Ross-Næss. Næss was her husband's original legal surname (from his father, businessman Arne Næss Jr.), while Ross was his mother's surname.

In May 2016, Simpson said she was eschewing a possible return to acting in order to focus on making a new album: "I’ve been writing music with my husband and that's been so much fun, we’ve just been [trying to] find our sound, we’ve written like 10 songs but we’re going to write a whole bunch more." But in early 2005, her music website went offline—with an error—for months and, as of early September 2018, it remained offline despite her claims to return to music. In 2018, Simpson and Evan Ross teamed up with French brand Zadig & Voltaire and designed a unisex clothing collection titled "Jagger Snow."

That same year, Simpson voiced Strelka in the animated movie Space Dogs Adventure to the Moon, alongside Alicia Silverstone. Simpson also confirmed to Us Weekly that new music would be released in 2019, which appeared to suggest she was working on her upcoming fourth studio album after an eleven-year hiatus.

On September 9, 2018, she was slated to return to the world of TV-reality shows with Ashlee+Evan, on E! Entertainment Television. Simpson and Ross released their debut duet single, "I Do" on September 7, 2018. The couple was expected to release a full-length album later that year, but instead released an extended play record, Ashlee + Evan.

In April 2020, Simpson announced she was pregnant with her third child, a son. She gave birth to Ziggy Blu on October 29, 2020.

Public image

Simpson has appeared on the covers of numerous magazines, including the USA's Women's Health, Jane, CosmoGirl, Shape, Allure, YM, Marie Claire, Redbook and Seventeen; Germany's Glamour; Japan's Blenda and Elle; and Russia's Elle Girl. She has appeared on several international editions of Cosmopolitan, such as Georgia, Serbia, Russia, Italy, Greece, Ukraine, Slovenia, Netherlands, US and Australia. She has appeared in television commercials for Liquid Ice, HP, Zellers and Pizza Hut. She appeared in print ads for Skechers and ThermaSilk.

Forbes listed Simpson as one of the "Richest Young Celebrities", it is reported she earned $8.3 million in 2005. Forbes placed Simpson and her then-husband Pete Wentz at No. 20 on their list of "Top 20 Celebrity Cash Couples" with their  $9.5 million combined income.

With the release of Autobiography, Simpson instantaneously became marketed as an "anti-Britney", drawing comparisons to artists such as Avril Lavigne and Fefe Dobson. The media noted her "punk-rock" image and style as a contrast to her sister Jessica. With the success of Jessica's reality television series Newlyweds, the sisters became household names in the media and became the focus of much attention. She cites her childhood as being the time when she began to sing and admits that she dreamed of being on Broadway and did not expect to break into the pop music scene.

Vocally, Simpson is an alto with a two-octave vocal range. She trains with a vocal coach, and studies Etta James and Aretha Franklin albums for vocal inspiration. She has cited Guns N' Roses, Gwen Stefani, No Doubt, Joan Jett, The Runaways, Madonna, Pat Benatar, Green Day, Alanis Morissette, Fiona Apple, Chrissie Hynde, and Debbie Harry from Blondie as her musical influences.

Filmography

Film

Television

Theatre

Discography

 Autobiography (2004)
 I Am Me (2005)
 Bittersweet World (2008)

See also
 List of awards and nominations received by Ashlee Simpson
 List of Ashlee Simpson concert tours

References

External links

 
21st-century American actresses
21st-century American singers
21st-century American women singers
Living people
Actresses from Texas
American dance musicians
American female dancers
Dancers from Texas
Feminist musicians
American women pop singers
American women singer-songwriters
American film actresses
American pop rock singers
American television actresses
Musicians from Dallas
Participants in American reality television series
Singer-songwriters from Texas
Southern Baptists
American contraltos
Year of birth missing (living people)